The Big Scrub was the largest area of subtropical lowland rainforest in eastern Australia. It was intensively cleared for agricultural use in the 19th century (1801–1900) by settlers. Less than 1% now remains.

Located on the North Coast of New South Wales, between what is now the towns of Byron Bay (east) and Lismore (west), the core Big Scrub area consisted of an estimated 900 square kilometres of subtropical rainforest. It primarily grows on fertile basalt and floodplain derived soils.

The Big Scrub existed in the Bundjalung Aboriginal Nation. Traditionally the Bundjalung (particularly those that spoke the Widgjabal language of the Bundjalung nation) traversed it via walking trails, and maintained a few grassed clearings for camping and hunting within the rainforest. Rainforest bushfood were a regular part of the traditional Bundjalung diet, including staples like Black Bean, Castanospermum australe, which is detoxified before eating.

The Big Scrub was dominated by White Booyong (Heritiera trifoliolata) and Australian Red Cedar (Toona australis). The latter was eagerly sought by the 'cedar getters' for its fine quality timber. The cedar getters were the first non-indigenous people to exploit the Big Scrub area.

Later, the Government of New South Wales gave allotments to potential farmers on the basis that they cleared it of rainforest. Hence, most of the Big Scrub was cleared, and the surviving Bundjalung were placed into reservations.

In the 20th century, interest in rainforest and conservation resulted in a greater effort to conserve the few remaining remnants of the Big Scrub. The major remnants are: the Booyong Flora Reserve, Victoria Park Nature Reserve, Davis Scrub Nature Reserve, Boatharbour, and Hayters Hill Nature Reserve. These remnants have been subject to ecological restoration projects which involves the removal of invasive non-native weeds.

Big Scrub remnants have become a source of native foods for cropping, especially in recent years. These include the macadamia nut, riberry and Finger Lime.
Macadamia nut is now grown commercially over much of the former Big Scrub area, but the main species used in cropping, Macadamia integrifolia, did not naturally occur in the Big Scrub.

Remnant trees of the Big Scrub

See also

 Andrew Johnston Big Scrub Nature Reserve
 Booyong Flora Reserve
 Bungabbee State Forest
 Davis Scrub Nature Reserve
 Gondwana Rainforests of Australia
 Hayters Hill
 Victoria Park Nature Reserve

References

External links

Tourist attractions in New South Wales
Forests of New South Wales